KHII (88.9 FM, "Active Radio") is a radio station broadcasting a gospel music format. Licensed to Cloudcroft, New Mexico, United States, the station is currently owned by Southern New Mexico Radio Foundation.

History
The Federal Communications Commission issued a construction permit for the station on May 18, 1999. The station was assigned the call sign KBOD on June 25, 1999, and on July 9, 1999, changed its call sign to the current KHII. The station was granted its license to cover on August 9, 2002.

References

External links

Radio stations established in 2002
Gospel radio stations in the United States
2002 establishments in New Mexico
HII